The Scalpel is a commercial skyscraper in London, United Kingdom. It is located on Lime Street in the City of London financial area. Originally a nickname but subsequently designated as its official name, the term "Scalpel" was coined by the Financial Times due to the building's distinctive angular design. The building has also been noted for its similarity to a "play" media button due to how it looks from South of the River Thames. This follows a trend of nicknaming new buildings based upon their shape, such as the nearby Leadenhall Building, also known as "The Cheesegrater". It was designed by Kohn Pedersen Fox.

The Scalpel at 52 Lime Street is on the corner of Lime Street and Leadenhall Street, opposite the Lloyd's building and adjacent to the Willis Building. The skyscraper has been built for insurance company W. R. Berkley and is the firm's new European headquarters, occupying approximately one-quarter of the total office space. Other tenants that have leased space include Axis Novae, National Australia Bank, SAP, Morrison & Foerster, Britannia Financial Group, and Convex.

Planning
WRBC Services Ltd applied to the City of London Corporation for planning permission in September 2012 to demolish Prudential House (52–54 Lime Street and 21–26 Leadenhall Street), Allianz Cornhill House (27-27A Leadenhall Street), and Winterthur House (34–36 Leadenhall Street and 4–5 Billiter Street) and to construct a new building of 38 storeys comprising office and retail uses.

On 15 January 2013 the City of London Planning and Transportation Committee recommended that planning permission be granted for the application. On 11 June 2013 the Common Council of the City of London permitted the development to go ahead subject to certain conditions being met.

The construction of the new tower first required the demolition of three existing buildings on the  site. The building at 38 Leadenhall Street (on the corner of Billiter Street) will remain despite being within the block that the new tower will dominate.

Construction
Skanska were appointed as the main building contractor. In October 2013, the developers informed the Corporation of London that the project would commence on 23 November 2013.

See also
 List of tallest buildings and structures in London
 City of London landmarks
 Leadenhall Building, a skyscraper nearby
 St Andrew Undershaft, the church opposite on Leadenhall Street

References

External links

http://thescalpelec3.co.uk

Skyscrapers in the City of London
Kohn Pedersen Fox buildings
Office buildings completed in 2018
Skyscraper office buildings in London
2018 establishments in England